Spargursville is an unincorporated community in Ross County, in the U.S. state of Ohio.

History
A post office called Spargursville was established in 1901, and remained in operation until 1955. The community was named after a pioneer citizen.

References

Unincorporated communities in Ross County, Ohio
Unincorporated communities in Ohio